Eupithecia relaxata is a moth in the family Geometridae. It is found in Afghanistan, Turkmenistan (the Kopet-Dagh Mountains), Iran, Tajikistan (the Pamir Mountains), Kazakhstan, Kyrgyzstan (the Tien-Shan Mountains), Pakistan (Baltistan), Jammu & Kashmir, India (the Ladakh Range), north-western China (Xinjiang) and Mongolia (the Mongol Altai Mountains).

There are two generations per year. Adults of the second generation are smaller than the first.

The larvae have been found in scrub woodland on Amygdalus spartioides in Iran.

References

Moths described in 1904
relaxata
Moths of Asia